is a passenger railway station located in Kawasaki-ku, Kawasaki, Kanagawa Prefecture, Japan, operated by the private railway company Keikyū.

Lines
Daishibashi Station is served by the Keikyū Daishi Line and is located 3.8 kilometers from the terminus of the line at Keikyū Kawasaki  Station.

Station layout
The station consists of two underground opposed side platforms serving two tracks.

Platforms

Former station
The former above-ground station consisted of two side platform serving two tracks.

History
Keihin Electric Express Railway took over the station from June 1, 1948 after it was spun off from Tokyu. The station building was rebuilt on November 30, 1968. The station was built with a third track for terminating trains, but it was removed during 1990.

The station was moved underground on March 2, 2019 to reduce traffic congestion from level crossings on Sanayo-doro Avenue.

Keikyū introduced station numbering to its stations on 21 October 2010; Daishibashi Station was assigned station number KK25.

The name was changed because of the station's adjacency to the Daishi Bridge linking Kawasaki City to Tokyo's Ōta Ward.

Passenger statistics
In fiscal 2019, the station was used by an average of 10,803 passengers daily. 

The passenger figures for previous years are as shown below.

Surrounding area
 Kawasaki City Daishi Junior High School
 Kawasaki City Tonomachi Elementary School
 Kawasaki Daishi Kaigan Post Office

See also
 List of railway stations in Japan

References

External links

 

Railway stations in Kanagawa Prefecture
Keikyū Daishi Line
Railway stations in Kawasaki, Kanagawa
Railway stations in Japan opened in 1944